Seaforth Peace Park, formerly Seaforth Park, is a park in Vancouver's Kitsilano neighbourhood, in British Columbia, Canada. The park's name refers to the neighboring Seaforth Armoury.

History
The land was originally part of the Kitsilano Indian Reserve. Interest in converting the land to a park began in the 1920s. The property was designated a park by 1949, though no dedication was held.

In July 1986, the Vancouver Park Board approved a fountain memorial to honor victims of the 1945 atomic bombing of Hiroshima. The memorials, which was created by Sam Carter, features a water-filled bronze cauldron on a granite base and an eternal flame.

In 1992, Seaforth Park was renamed Seaforth Peace Park during a ceremony in which local students created a peace grove consisting of twelve Cercidiphyllum (katsura) trees on the south side of the park.

References

1949 establishments in British Columbia
Parks in Vancouver
Protected areas established in the 20th century